Mayamalavagowla (pronounced ) is a raga of Carnatic music (musical scale of South Indian classical music). It is classified as 15th melakarta raga under Venkatamakhin's melakarta system. Originally known as malavagowla, "maya" was prefixed to it after the advent of the scheme of the 72 melas. The number 15 was assigned to it following the Katapayadi sankhya system. This is a morning raga.

Structure and Lakshana 

Venkatamakhin defines its lakshana thus:

पूर्णो माळवगोळाख्यः
स ग्रहो गीयते सदा

Mayamalavagowla is the 3rd raga in the 3rd chakra, Agni. Its mnemonic name is Agni-Go. Its mnemonic phrase is sa ra gu ma pa dha nu. Its  structure is as follows (see swaras in Carnatic music for details on below notation and terms):

: 
: 

The notes in this raga are ṣaḍjam, śuddha r̥ṣabham, antara gāndhāram, śuddha madhyamam, pañcamam, śuddha dhaivatam and kākalī niṣādam. As it is a mēḷakarttā rāgam, by definition it is a sampurna rāgam (has all seven notes in ascending and descending scale). It is the śuddha madhyamam equivalent of Kamavardhini (also known as Pantuvarāḷi), which is the 51st in the mēḷakarttā scale.

The gamakas in the raga are unique in that conversely to the G-M relationship in Śankarābharaṇaṃ, G is sung in oscillation (M,G M,G M,G) while M is held constant. There is no bold M-P gamaka as in Śankarābharaṇaṃ as well. R and D are also usually sung in oscillation with S and P respectively, making the only constant notes S, M, and P. Of course, these rules are occasionally broken for effect (e.g., holding N flat before ascending to S).

Nature of raga 
This auspicious raga evokes śānta (peace) rasa and pathos. It creates a soothing effect, suitable to sing at all times, particularly, the first prātaḥ-sandhyā-kālaṃ (dawn). It is commonly used for beginners' lessons such as Sarali Varisais or Sarala Svarās (Kannada), etc. Since it eschews vivadi swaras (relatively discordant notes), has a uniform distance between svara sthānas (relative position of notes) and has symmetry, they are easier to learn. It is an ancient rāgam.

It is a Sampurna raga. Also, it is a sarva svara gamaka vārika rakti rāga. It has a large number of janya ragas (derived scales) assigned to it. This rāgam corresponds to Bhairav in Hindustani music. It is called as a "rakti" raga because of its high melodic content.

It is also defined as a mūrcana kāraka méLa since it can be used for Graha bhedam on madhyamam and rishabham to result in Simhendramadhyamam and Rasikapriya respectively. Graha bhedam is the step taken in keeping the relative note frequencies same, while shifting the Shruti (or drone) to another note in the rāgam. For further details and an illustration refer Graha bhedam on Māyamālavagowla.

Janya ragams 
Mayamalavagowla has quite a few janya ragams associated with it, of which Bowli, Jaganmohini, Gowla, Gowlipantu, Janaranjini, Lalita, Nadanamakriya, Revagupti, Saveri and Malahari are quite well known. See List of janya Ragas for a full list of janyas.

Popular compositions 
All the basic swara exercises (Sarala, Janti, Daatu, etc.) are set to the Mayamalavagowla raga. These are learnt by beginners in Carnatic music.  It is commonly used in the basics, credited to Purandara Dasa's work in his time, when he did much work towards standardizing the teaching of Carnatic music into a fully graded system. Lambodara lakumikara by Purandaradasa is generally used for this raga. The first mini-songs (geetam) that are taught after the completion of basic exercises are set to Malahari, a janya of Mayamalavagowla. Muthuswami Dikshitar's famous  kritis (eight compositions with their raga names ending as gowla), on Goddess Nilothpalamba has  for one of them.

Some of the popular compositions in Mayamalavagowla are Deva Deva composed by Swathi Thirunal and Adikkondar by Muthu Thandavar. A list of popular compositions in Mayamalalavagowla is as follows.

 Varṇaṃ - śrī rājarājēśvari – [Unknown Composer]
 tulasī daḻamulacē saṃtōṣamuga – Tyagaraja in Telugu
 Mēru-samāna-dhira – Tyagaraja in Telugu
 Dēvī Śrī tulasammā – Tyagaraja in Telugu
 Vidulaku Mrokkeda – Tyagaraja in Telugu
 Dēva Dēva Kalayāmi – Swathi Thirunal
 Kailāsa nilaya dayāsāgara - Mahesh Mahadev in Sanskrit
 Māyātīta Svarūpiṇi – Ponnaiyya Pillai (Direct Disciple of Muthuswami Dikshitar) in Sanskrit
 Śrīnāthādi Guruguho jayati – Muthuswami Dikshitar (The very first composition of Muthuswami Dikshitar) in Sanskrit
 Śyāmalāmbikē pāhi māṃ – Dr. M. Balamuralikrishna
 ādityaṃ dēvādi-dēvaṃ akhilāṇḍa-nāthaṃ āśrayē – Muthiah Bhagavatar
 Dina-maṇi-vaṃśa dīna-janāvana – Muthiah Bhagavatar
 Hara mṛtyuñjaya ambikā-nāyaka hari kamalāsana – Muthiah Bhagavatar
 Popular Adithala Varnam- Sarasija-nābha – Swathi Thirunal
 Ambā yuvati jaganmātē akhila-janani dayānidhē – Ashok R Madhav
 Avadh sukhdāyi bājē badhāyī ratan simhāsan par – Swathi Thirunal
 Bhaja rē mānasa vraja-bālaṃ – Swarajāti – H Yoganarasimhan
 Caraṇaṃ śaraṇaṃ ayyappā – Ganapati Sacchidananda
 Cintayāmi santataṃ – G Sampath
 Cintaye'haṃ jānaki-kāntaṃ santataṃ cintitārtha – Mysore Vasudevacharya
 Daśaratha-nandana – Mysore Vasudevacharya
 Dēva-dēveśa – R K Suryanarayana
 Dēva-dēvōttama – Govindacharya
 Dēvi kāmākṣi para-śiva-dēhārtha – Ogirala Viraraghava Sharma
 Durgā lakṣmi sarasvati – Lalita Venkataraman
 Kāmākṣīṃ kamalākṣīṃ – R K Padmanabha
 Jaya jagadisha hare – from eulogy composed by Jayadeva
 Krpakari shankari karunakari kapalishvari – Rukmini Ramani
 Mantra svarupam – Bangalore S Mukund
 Kshira jaladhi niketana – Pallavur Mani Iyer
 Kshira sagara shayana raksha shara nivasini – Jayachamaraja wodeyar
 Maya mohini maheshvari – Mangalam Ganapati
 Kaladevathe Saraswathi – V. Dakshinamoorthy
 Varṇaṃ - guri tappaka pūjiṃcitini from Janakaraga Varna Manjari – Nallan Chakravarthy Murthy

This raga has also been very popularly used in film music. Numerous well recognized songs have been set in this raga. Ilayaraja has composed many hit songs in this raga.

Telugu film songs

Tamil film songs

Malayalam film songs

Notes

References 

Melakarta ragas